Sorin Mădălin Tabacariu (born 23 July 1994) is a Romanian professional footballer who plays as a midfielder.

References

External links
 
 

1994 births
Living people
People from Roman, Romania
Romanian footballers
Association football midfielders
Liga I players
Liga II players
Liga III players
CSM Ceahlăul Piatra Neamț players
FC Voluntari players
FC Argeș Pitești players
CS Aerostar Bacău players